Întotdeauna pentru totdeauna (Always Forever) is the sixth studio album by Romanian hip hop group B.U.G. Mafia. It was released on October 17, 2000, by Cat Music in Romania. Recording sessions for the album took place in 2000 at the Magic Sound studios in Bucharest, Romania. The album's name is an untranslatable Romanian play on words, basically meaning that the group will always remain unchanged so that they can go into history, thus being remembered forever. B.U.G. Mafia's official website mentions this album as being one of their most underrated, despite its sales being above average.

Upon release, Întotdeauna pentru totdeauna received generally positive reviews from music critics and earned considerable sales success, sparking two successful singles.

Track listing
Source: Discogs

All song titles, notes, samples, writing and production credits are according to the album booklet.

Lyrics by Tataee, Caddy, Uzzi, Puya, M&G, Maximilian.

Sample credits

"Runda A 7-a (Intro)"
Ethnicolor by Jean Michel Jarre.
"Fete Suspecte"
The Payback by James Brown.
"Între Noapte și Zi"
If You Want Me to Stay by Sly and the Family Stone.

References

2000 albums
B.U.G. Mafia albums